Adela ridingsella,  Ridings' fairy moth, is a moth of the Adelidae family or fairy longhorn moths. It was described by James Brackenridge Clemens in 1864. It is widespread in eastern North America, from Nova Scotia, Ontario, Quebec and Maine to Pennsylvania and the mountains of North Carolina.

The basal half of the forewings are brownish-orange with silvery median and apical bands. The distal half of the wing has a patch of large black spots near the inner margin and small black spots at the middle of the wing. The hindwings are uniformly brownish-orange. Adults are on wing from June to July.

Larvae found in petiole galls on Parthenocissus quinquefolia might belong to this species. The larvae later formed external cases.

References

Adelidae
Moths described in 1864
Moths of North America
Taxa named by James Brackenridge Clemens